Parapalos (Pin Boy) is a 2004 Argentine and Belgian film, directed by Ana Poliak, and written by Poliak and Santiago Loza.

Plot
The film tells of a Ringo (Adrian Suarez), a young man who moves from the city to the country, and moves in with his cousin Nancy (Nancy Torres).  He takes a job as a Pin Boy at the local bowling alley.

Ringo has to go through to a rather physical and extensive training session, and is warned that the job is physically demanding and hazardous and he is given no health insurance.

But Ringo takes the job with enthusiasm and seems content doing the physical work.  He listens to the folktales of his older, more experienced co-workers, particularly the well-traveled former hippie who calls himself Nippur.

Ringo comes home from work as Nancy goes out to her job, and they share breakfast before she leaves.  They establish a good relationship that develops into a good friendship.

Cast
 Adrián Suárez
 Roque Chappay
 Armando Quiroga
 José Luis Seytón Guzmán
 Nancy Torres
 Dorian Waldemar

Background
In an interview with a social justice journalist David Walsh at the Buenos Aires 6th International Festival of Independent Cinema, director and producer Ana Poliak discussed why she made the film.  She said, "It was the first time that I had the feeling that we were not all equal.... I could see behind the back walls of the alley, where I saw kids my age, naked from the waist up, who were working very, very hard. I couldn't quite understand the situation.... During the match I would concentrate on the boys' feet and hands, and I felt that on the other side there was another world, parallel to mine, which I couldn't comprehend. I started from this idea to make the film," she added, "This is connected, in some way, to the differences in social classes that I discovered when I was little, and I guess that's why I'm so interested in this type of character. I can't find answers for these questions. I think that my social class doesn’t have that capacity, that light."

Reception

Critical response
Film critic Doug Cummings liked the film and wrote, "Poliak's DV camera maintains a steady gaze, intensifying the subtleties of the workers' conversations in their cramped and shadowy confines with tight compositions. The film's careful sound design emphasizes the ambient noises and shapes them to reflect Adri·n’s subjective experience. In many ways, the film’s formal claustrophobia is reminiscent of Lucrecia Martel's The Holy Girl, but Pin Boy is far less lush, emphasizing its austere and potentially dangerous environment with flat lighting and compelling, matter-of-fact realism."

Awards
Wins
 Buenos Aires International Festival of Independent Cinema: Best Film; Ana Poliak; 2004.
 Entrevues Film Festival, France: Grand Prix Foreign Film, Ana Poliak; 2004.

Film Festivals
 Belfort Entrevues Film Festival
 Buenos Aires International Festival of Independent Cinema
 Cinemanila International Film Festival
 La Rochelle Film Festival
 London Film Festival
 Oslo International Film Festival
 Rio de Janeiro International Film Festival
 San Francisco International Film Festival
 Thessaloniki International Film Festival
 Toulouse Latin America Film Festival
 Wisconsin Film Festiva

References

External links
 
 
 Parapalos at the cinenacional.com 

2004 films
2004 drama films
Argentine independent films
2000s Spanish-language films
Belgian independent films